Shaun Tan (born 1974) is an Australian artist, writer and film maker. He won an Academy Award for The Lost Thing, a 2011 animated film adaptation of a 2000 picture book he wrote and illustrated. Other books he has written and illustrated include The Red Tree and The Arrival.

Tan was born in Fremantle, Western Australia, and grew up in the northern suburbs of Perth, Western Australia. In 2006, his wordless graphic novel The Arrival won the Book of the Year prize as part of the New South Wales Premier's Literary Awards. The same book won the Children's Book Council of Australia Picture Book of the Year award in 2007. and the Western Australian Premier's Book Awards Premier's Prize in 2006.

Tan's work has been described as an "Australian vernacular" that is "at once banal and uncanny, familiar and strange, local and universal, reassuring and scary, intimate and remote, guttersnipe and sprezzatura. No rhetoric, no straining for effect. Never other than itself."

For his career contribution to "children's and young adult literature in the broadest sense" Tan won the 2011 Astrid Lindgren Memorial Award from the Swedish Arts Council, the biggest prize in children's literature.

Biography

Early life
As a boy, Tan spent time illustrating poems and stories and drawing dinosaurs, robots and spaceships. At school he was known as a talented artist. At the age of eleven, he became a fan of The Twilight Zone television series as well as books that bore similar themes. Tan cites Ray Bradbury as a favorite at this time. These stories led to Tan writing his own short stories. Of his effort at writing as a youth, Tan tells, "I have a small pile of rejection letters as testament to this ambition!" At the age of sixteen, Tan's first illustration appeared in the Australian magazine Aurealis in 1990.

Transition to illustration
Tan almost studied to become a geneticist, and enjoyed chemistry, physics, history and English while in high school as well as art and claimed that he did not really know what he wanted to do. During his university studies, Tan decided to move from academic studies to working as an artist.

Tan continued his education at the University of Western Australia where he studied Fine Arts, English Literature and History. While this was of interest to him, there was little practical work involved. In 1995, he graduated with a Bachelor of Arts.

Work process
Initially, Tan worked in black and white because the final reproductions would be printed that way. Some black and white mediums he used include pens, inks, acrylics, charcoal, scraperboard, photocopies, and linocuts. Tan's current colour works still begin in black and white. He uses a graphite pencil to make sketches on ordinary copy paper. The sketches are then reproduced numerous times with different versions varying with parts added or removed. Sometimes scissors are used for this purpose. The cut and paste collage idea in these early stages is often extend to the finished production with many of his illustrations using such materials as "glass, metal, cuttings from other books and dead insects".

Tan describes himself as a slow worker who revises his work many times along the way. He is interested in loss and alienation, and believes that children in particular react well to issues of natural justice. He feels he is "like a translator" of ideas, and is happy and flattered to see his work adapted and interpreted in film and music (such as by the Australian Chamber Orchestra).

Influences
Tan draws from a large source of inspiration and cites many influences on his work. His comment on the subject is: "I'm pretty omnivorous when it comes to influences, and I like to admit this openly." Some influences are very direct. The Lost Thing is a strong example where Tan makes visual references to famous artworks. Many of his influences are a lot more subtle visually, some of the influences are ideological.

Patronage
The Shaun Tan Award for Young Artists is sponsored by the City of Subiaco and open to all Perth school children between 5 and 17 years. The award is aimed at encouraging creativity in two-dimensional works. It is held annually with award winners announced in May and finalists' works exhibited at the Subiaco Library throughout June.

Awards
1992 L. Ron Hubbard Illustrators of the Future Contest: First Australian to win
1993 Ditmar Award, Artwork, Nominated for Relics
1995 Ditmar Award, Professional Artwork, Winner for Aurealis and Eidolon
1996 Ditmar Award, Artwork, Winner for Eidolon Issue 19 (Cover)
1997 Ditmar Award, Professional Artwork, Nominated for artwork in Eidolon and the cover of The Stray Cat
1998Crichton Award, Winner for The Viewer
 Children's Book Council of Australia, Notable Book for The Viewer
 Ditmar Award, Artwork/Artist, Nominated for The Viewer
 Western Australian Premier's Book Awards, Children's Book, Shortlisted for The Playground
1999 Aurealis Conveners' Award for Excellence for The Rabbits
 Children's Book Council of Australia, Notable Book for The Playground
 Children's Book Council of Australia, Picture Book of the Year, Winner for The Rabbits
 Ditmar Award, Australian Professional Artwork, Nominated for The Rabbits
 Spectrum Gold Award for Book Illustration for The Rabbits
2000 APA Design Award for Memorial
 Children's Book Council of Australia, Picture Book of the Year, Honour Book for Memorial
 Ditmar Award, Artwork, Winner for The Coode St Review of Science Fiction
 Spectrum Gold Award for Book Illustration
 Western Australian Premier's Book Awards, Writing for Young Adults award, Shortlisted for Lost Thing
2001 Ditmar Award, Artwork, Winner for The Lost Thing
 Children's Book Council of Australia, Picture Book of the Year, Honour Book for The Lost Thing
 Western Australian Premier's Book Awards, Children's Books, Shortlisted for Red Tree
 World Fantasy Award for Best Artist
2002 Children's Book Council of Australia, Picture Book of the Year, Honour Book for The Red Tree
 New South Wales Premier's Literary Awards, Patricia Wrightson Prize for Children's Literature Winner for Red Tree
2006 Premier's Prize and Children's Books category winner in the Western Australian Premier's Book Awards for The Arrival
2007 Ditmar Award, Artwork, Nominated for The Arrival
 Children's Book Council of Australia, Picture Book of the Year, Honour Book for The Lost Thing
 World Fantasy Award for Best Artist
 New South Wales Premier's Literary Awards, Community Relations Commission Award for The Arrival
 Children's Book Council of Australia, Picture Book of the Year for "The Arrival".
2008 Angoulême International Comics Festival Prize for Best Comic Book for Là où vont nos pères, the French edition of The Arrival
 Hugo Award, Nominated for Best Related Book for The Arrival
 Hugo Award, Nominated for Best Professional Artist (also in 2009 and 2010)
 Western Australian Premier's Book Awards Young Adult category winner for Tales from Outer Suburbia
 Boston Globe-Horn Book Award, Special Citation for The Arrival
2009 Ditmar Award, Artwork, Winner for Tales from Outer Suburbia
 Children's Book Council of Australia, Picture Book of the Year, Honour Book for The Lost Thing
 World Fantasy Award for Best Artist
2010 Adelaide Festival Awards for Literature, winner of the Children's Literature Award category and the South Australian Premier's Award for Tales from Outer Suburbia
 Dromkeen Medal
 Hugo Award, Best Professional Artist
2011 Academy Award, Won Best Short Film (Animated) for The Lost Thing
 Astrid Lindgren Memorial Award
 Ditmar Award, Artwork, Winner for The Lost Thing
 Ditmar Award, Artwork, Nominated for Australis Imaginarium
 Hugo Award, Best Professional Artist
 Peter Pan Prize for the Swedish translation of The Arrival
2014 Locus Award, Artist
 Ditmar Award, Artwork, Winner for Rules of Summer
 Boston Globe-Horn Book Award, Picture Book Honor for Rules of Summer
2019 World Fantasy Award for Best Artist, Finalist:Children's Book Council of Australia, Picture Book of the Year, Winner for Cicada
2020

Kate Greenaway Medal, Winner for Tales from the Inner City

Adaptations
The Red Tree, a play based on Tan's book of the same name, was commissioned by the Queensland Performing Arts Centre.
The Red Tree, a music performance created by new composer Michael Yezerski with Richard Tognetti; performed by the Australian Chamber Orchestra with the youth choir Gondwana Voices, and accompanied by images from the book.
 The Arrival. Images from this book were projected during a performance by the Australian Chamber Orchestra of conductor Richard Tognetti's arrangement of Shostakovich's String Quartet No. 15
 The Lost Thing has been adapted as an Oscar-winning animated short film.
 The Lost Thing inspired an album by Sydney band Lo-Tel, complete with artwork from the book.
 The Lost Thing has also been adapted as a play by the Jigsaw Theatre Company, a youth theatre company in Canberra. This was the main event for the National Gallery of Australia's Children Festival (Canberra) and at the Chookahs! Kids Festival (Melbourne) in 2006.
 The Lost Thing was the theme for the 2006 Chookahs! Kids Festival at The Arts Centre in Melbourne, with many different activities based on concepts from the book.
 The Arrival was adapted for the stage by Red Leap Theatre.
The Arrival was again projected on a screen to an orchestral score, performed by Orkestra of the Underground with 18 pieces created by musician and composer Ben Walsh. This was performed in the Opera House in Sydney, The Melbourne Recital Centre and Her Majesty's Theatre in Adelaide.
The Rabbits was the basis for an opera of the same title by Kate Miller-Heidke which was premiered at the 2015 Perth International Arts Festival.

Works

Books

As illustrator
 The Pipe, by James Moloney (1996)
 The Stray Cat, by Steven Paulsen (1996)
 The Doll, by Janine Burke (1997)
 The Half Dead, by Garry Disher (1997)
 The Viewer, written by Gary Crew (1997)
 The Rabbits, written by John Marsden (1998)
 The Hicksville Horror, by Nette Hilton (1999)
 The Puppet, by Ian Bone (1999)
 Memorial, written by Gary Crew (1999)
 Pretty Monsters by Kelly Link (2008)

As author and illustrator
 The Playground (1997)
 The Lost Thing (2000)
 The Red Tree (2001)
 The Arrival (2006)
 Tales from Outer Suburbia (2008)
 The Bird King and other sketches (2011)
 The Oopsatoreum: inventions of Henry A. Mintox, with the Powerhouse Museum (2012)
 Rules of Summer (2013)
 The Singing Bones (2016)
 Cicada (2018)
 Tales from the Inner City (2018)
Dog (2020)
Eric (2020)
Creature (2022)

Installations
Mural in the Children's Section of the Subiaco Public Library (Perth, Western Australia).

References

Bibliography
 "About Shaun Tan" Aboriginal Student Support and Parent Awareness Program Retrieved 27 December 2005
 "About Our Authors and Illustrators". Lothian Books Retrieved 27 December 2005
 Haber, K. (2001) "Shaun Tan: Out Of Context", Locus magazine Retrieved 27 December 2005
 "Media Statement (2005)", Western Australia Department of Education and Training Retrieved 27 December 2005
 "The Red Tree", Queensland Performing Arts Centre Retrieved 27 December 2005
 "Shaun Tan Award For Young Artists", City of Subiaco Retrieved 27 December 2005
 "Shaun Tan: Biography", Dreamstone Retrieved 27 December 2005
 "Shaun puts students in the picture (2000)", The University of Melbourne Retrieved 27 December 2005
 "Tan, Shaun", AustLit Retrieved 27 December 2005
 Tan, S. (2001) "Originality and Creativity", AATE/ALEA Joint National Conference Retrieved 27 December 2005
 Tan, S. (2001) "Picture Books: Who Are They For?", AATE/ALEA Joint National Conference Retrieved 27 December 2005

External links

 
 
Shaun Tan collection at Beinart Gallery
InFrame.tv interview with Shaun Tan on the animated adaptation of his book The Lost Thing
The Lost Thing: Online interactive version
Interview with Shaun Tan on Australian Edge
Webquest on "Representations of Belonging" – using the picture books of Shaun Tan by Julie Bain
Webquest on "Viewing the Viewer" – postmodern picture books for teaching and learning in secondary English education by Julie Bain
Drawn Outsider – profile of Shaun Tan
Shaun Tan's Gallery with biography and artbooks on Inside Your ART

Australian children's writers
Australian male novelists
Australian speculative fiction artists
Australian children's book illustrators
World Fantasy Award-winning artists
Astrid Lindgren Memorial Award winners
Australian people of Chinese descent
University of Western Australia alumni
People from Fremantle
Artists from Perth, Western Australia
Artists from Melbourne
1974 births
Living people
Directors of Best Animated Short Academy Award winners